Mladen Milinković (Serbian Cyrillic: Mлaдeн Mилинкoвић; born 14 May 1968 in Loznica) is a Serbian football coach and former player. He is currently head coach of Saudi Arabian club Al-Sahel. He played as midfielder for FK Loznica, FK Mačva Šabac, Drina Zvornik, Omonia Aradippou from Cyprus, FF Jaro from Finland, Naoussa F.C. and Kastoria F.C. from Greece.

Position 
Milinkovic played in the position of central midfielder but could also operate as a central defender.

Career

As player 
He started his career in Serbian club FK Gučevo, then went to Mačva Šabac. In 1988, he went to Bosnia, where he played 3 seasons for FK Drina Zvornik. From FK Drina Zvornik he went to FK Loznica in 1991 and spent 2 seasons in club where on 3 July 1993 he scored deciding goal against Vrbas  in play-off for promotion to Seconde League of Yugoslavia, the biggest success in club's history. From 1993 to 1996 he played in Cypriot First Division for Omonia Aradippou. After Cyprus he returned to FK Loznica where he stayed until the beginning of 1998 when he went to Finland, where he played for FF Jaro in two periods(1998–2000, 2001). Also he played Second League in Greece for Naoussa F.C. (2000) and Kastoria F.C. (2002). Finished his career in FK Radnički Stobex.

As coach 
Started his coaching career in 2003 in FK Radnički Stobex  where he acted as Head Coach/Player. He worked in First League of the Republika Srpska as head coach of FK Drina Zvornik from 2004 to 2006 and 2007 to 2009.

In season 2014–15 as head coach of FK Radnik Surdulica Milinković won Serbian First League and made historical success to promote in Serbian Superleague. He worked in Albania in two teams Luftëtari (2016–2017) and Kukësi (2017). After that he went to Azerbaijan, where he was head coach of Keşla FK. From 5 July until 6 November 2019 Milinkovć worked in Sweden, where he was head coach of Syrianska FC.

From 9 November 2019 until 30 July 2021 Milinković was head coach of FK Budućnost Podgorica. He guided the club to successive Montenegrin First League titles in seasons 2019–20 and 2020–21, first time in the history of FK Budućnost Podgorica. In 2020–21 season FK Budućnost Podgorica with Mladen Milinković in charge, had the most successful season in the history of the club winning first time the Double and broke many records in Montenegrin football, among them is winning title 7 rounds before the end, having the most wins in one season, finishing season with 28 points lead to the second place.

On 25 November 2022, Milinković was appointed as head coach of Saudi Arabian club Al-Sahel.

Education 
Coach with UEFA Pro Diploma.
Senior football coach – The coaches Academy – The faculty for Physical education in Niš.

Honours

As player 
FF Jaro
Finnish League Cup:
 Runner-up:1998
Finnish Cup:
Runner-up:1999

As coach 
FK Radnik Surdulica
Serbian First League:
Winner:2014–15
FK Budućnost Podgorica
Montenegrin First League:
Winner:2019–20,2020–21
Montenegrin Cup:
Winner:2020–21
Individual
Montenegrin First League Best Coach in 2020

References

External links 
 

1968 births
Living people
Sportspeople from Loznica
Association football defenders
Serbian footballers
FK Mačva Šabac players
FK Drina Zvornik players
FK Loznica players
Omonia Aradippou players
FF Jaro players
Naoussa F.C. players
Kastoria F.C. players
FK Radnički Klupci players
Veikkausliiga players
Cypriot First Division players
Cypriot Second Division players
Serbian expatriate footballers
Expatriate footballers in Cyprus
Serbian expatriate sportspeople in Cyprus
Expatriate footballers in Finland
Serbian expatriate sportspeople in Finland
Expatriate footballers in Greece
Serbian expatriate sportspeople in Greece
Serbian football managers
Serbian expatriate football managers
FK Drina Zvornik managers
Expatriate football managers in Bosnia and Herzegovina
Serbian expatriate sportspeople in Bosnia and Herzegovina
Luftëtari Gjirokastër managers
FK Kukësi managers
Saudi First Division League managers
Expatriate football managers in Albania
Serbian expatriate sportspeople in Albania
Expatriate football managers in Saudi Arabia
Serbian expatriate sportspeople in Saudi Arabia